Arthur Stone may refer to:

 Arthur Stone (priest) (1852–1927), Irish-English Anglican priest and Archdeacon of Calcutta
 Arthur J. Stone (1847–1938), American silversmith
 Arthur Burr Stone (1874–1943), American aviation pioneer
 Arthur Stone (actor) (1883–1940), American film actor
 Arthur Thomas Stone (1897–1988), politician in Saskatchewan, Canada
 Arthur Harold Stone (1916–2000), British mathematician 
 Arthur Stone (rugby union) (born 1960), New Zealand rugby union player
 The Arthur stone, or Artognou stone, an archaeological find in Cornwall, UK

See also
 Arthur's Stone, Herefordshire, a Neolithic chambered tomb
 Stone Arthur, a fell in the English Lake District